Gianfranco Zigoni (born 25 November 1944 in Oderzo) is an Italian former footballer who played as a forward or as a midfielder. Nicknamed Zigogol by his fans, he was a prolific goalscorer, and played with several major Serie A throughout his career in the 1960s and the 1970s, including Juventus and A.S. Roma. He was capable of playing both as a striker and as a left winger, and was known in particular for his talent and skillful playing style, as well as his 'colourful' personality and 'rebellious' character.

Career
Zigoni started his professional career at the age of 17 with Juventus, playing only four games in three seasons with the bianconeri (scoring one goal), and being successively loaned out to Genoa in 1964. With the rossoblu jersey, he spent a season in the Serie A, with the loan being renewed for another year following Genoa's relegation to Serie B. In 1966 he returned to Juventus, and stayed with the bianconeri until 1970, then leaving the club also because of his strained relationship with then Juve boss Heriberto Herrera. During this period, he also played his only game with the Italian team, a 1–0 win against Romania on 25 June 1967.

He successively signed for A.S. Roma, spending two seasons under the guidance of Helenio Herrera and scoring 12 goals with the giallorossi. In 1972, he moved to Verona, quickly becoming a team mainstay and a fan favourite, and playing six seasons with the scaligeri. In 1978, aged 34, he signed for Serie B's Brescia, playing two seasons with the rondinelle mostly as a backup player.

In 1980, he left professional football and returned to his native Oderzo, joining the local Serie D team, Opitergina. In 1983, he joined an offer from Terza Categoria club US Piavon, playing until the age of 43.

Personal life
Zigoni has four children. Of them, Gianmarco, an A.C. Milan player, has later become a footballer and made his debut with Serie B's Treviso in January 2009. He also scoring a goal in his first professional match.

Honours
Juventus
Serie A: 1962–63, 1966–67
Coppa delle Alpi: 1963

Roma
Anglo-Italian Cup: 1972

References

1944 births
Living people
People from Oderzo
Italian footballers
Juventus F.C. players
Genoa C.F.C. players
A.S. Roma players
Hellas Verona F.C. players
Brescia Calcio players
Serie A players
Serie B players
Association football forwards
Italy international footballers
Footballers from Veneto
Sportspeople from the Province of Treviso